Bayandurlu is a village and municipality in the Tartar Rayon of Azerbaijan. It has a population of 428.

References

Populated places in Tartar District